The rupee is the currency of the Seychelles. It is subdivided into 100 cents. In the local Seychellois Creole (Seselwa) language, it is called the roupi and roupie in French.  The ISO code is SCR. The abbreviation SR is sometimes used for distinction. By population, Seychelles is the smallest country to have an independent monetary policy. Several other currencies are also called rupee.

Banknotes

British colony 

The British Legislative Council authorized the establishment of a Board of Commissioners of Currency through the Paper Currency Ordinance of 1914, which was enacted by C. R. M. O'Brien, the Governor of the Colony of the Seychelles on 10 August 1914. In 1914, the government produced emergency issues of notes for 50c, Re. 1/-, Rs. 5/- and Rs. 10/-.

Standard issue notes began to be issued in 1918, with notes for 50c and Re. 1/-, followed by Rs. 5/-, Rs. 10/- and Rs. 50/- in 1928. The 50c and Re. 1/-  notes were issued until 1951 and phased out in favour of coins. Rs. 20/- and Rs. 100/- notes were first introduced in 1968, whilst the Rs. 5/- note was replaced by a coin in 1972.

Independent republic 

In 1976, the Seychelles Monetary Authority took over the issuance of paper money, issuing notes for Rs. 10/-, Rs. 25/-, Rs. 50/- and Rs. 100/-. This series featured the first President of the Seychelles, Sir James Mancham and replaced all colonial notes issued prior to independence.

In 1979, there was a redesign, featuring a more socialist and modernized theme reminiscent of the René regime. This series was also issued by the Central Bank of Seychelles when it took over full responsibility in the same year.

In 1989, a new series was introduced with better security features and colours.

In 1998, another more high-tech series was introduced with a more practical, ergonomic design. This series later saw an additional ₨.500/- note first introduced in 2005.

2011 update

On June 7, 2011, the Central Bank of Seychelles issued updated Rs. 50/-, Rs. 100/- and Rs. 500/- notes with improved security features. Each of the three banknotes has a holographic patch instead of a foil sailfish which currently appears on the notes. 
On the Rs. 50/- note, the silver holographic sailfish alternates between the number 50 and an image of the Aldabra rail, a flightless bird. 
On the Rs. 100/- note, the gold holographic sailfish alternates between the number 100 and an image of the Seychelles giant tortoise. 
On the Rs. 500/- note, the gold holographic sailfish alternates between the number 500 and an image of the Seychelles scops owl.

Additional security upgrades include a 2.5-mm wide fluorescent security thread on the Rs. 50/- note, a 2.5-mm wide colour-shifting security thread on the Rs. 100/- note, and a 3-mm wide colour-shifting security thread on the Rs. 500/- note. The notes are also protected by De La Rue's unique Gemini technology that fluoresces under ultraviolet light but appears normal in daylight.

The colour schemes of the notes have been revised, with the notes being more green, red, and orange, respectively, than the notes currently in circulation. The new notes also carry the year of printing, as well as the signature of Pierre Laporte, the bank's current governor. Existing notes remain legal tender and will be removed from circulation as they wear out.

2016 changes

In December 2016, the Central Bank of Seychelles issued a new series of banknotes to commemorate 40 years of Seychelles' independence. The theme of this series is "Seychelles' Unique Biodiversity - the backbone of the economy".

See also
 Economy of Seychelles
 Mauritian rupee

Notes

References

External links
 The banknotes of Seychelles 

Circulating currencies
Currencies of the British Empire
Currencies of the Commonwealth of Nations
Rupee, Seychelles
Currencies introduced in 1914